John E. Curtis (February 11, 1915 – October 21, 1999) was an American politician from the state of Alaska. He served in the Alaska House of Representatives from 1959 to 1961 as a Republican. He was Iñupiaq.

References

1915 births
1999 deaths
Inupiat people
Republican Party members of the Alaska House of Representatives
Native American state legislators in Alaska
People from Northwest Arctic Borough, Alaska
20th-century American politicians